Michigan Central Station (also known as Michigan Central Depot or MCS) is the historic former main intercity passenger rail station in Detroit, Michigan. Built for the Michigan Central Railroad, it replaced the original depot in downtown Detroit, which was shuttered after a major fire on December 26, 1913, forcing the still unfinished station into early service. Formally dedicated on January 4, 1914, the station remained open for business until the cessation of Amtrak service on January 6, 1988. The station building consists of a train depot and an office tower with thirteen stories, two mezzanine levels, and a roof height of 230 feet (70 m).  The Beaux-Arts style architecture was designed by architects who had previously worked together on Grand Central Terminal in New York, and it was the tallest rail station in the world at the time of its construction.

It is located behind Roosevelt Park, and the Roosevelt Warehouse is adjacent to the east, with a tunnel connection to the MCS. The city's Roosevelt Park serves as a grand entryway to the station. It was added to the National Register of Historic Places in 1975.

Since 2011, demolition works, minor structural repairs, repairs of the roof structure, and covering the glass roof openings in the concourse have been performed. The basement, which was once full of water, has been fully drained. Barbed wire fencing has been installed in an attempt to keep out vandals and the windows in the tower have been replaced. Restoration projects and plans had gone as far as the negotiation process, but none had come to fruition until May 2018 when Ford Motor Company purchased the building for redevelopment into a mixed use facility and cornerstone of the company's new Corktown campus. Between 2018 and 2021, the building's exterior was repaired and the electrical and mechanical systems were replaced; in August 2021, the renovation entered the third and final phase, focusing on the interior.

Images of the building prior to the Ford purchase remain a premier example of ruins photography. The building has also been featured in several television programs, films and music videos.

History

As an active station
The building began operating as Detroit's main passenger depot in 1913 after the older Michigan Central Station burned on December 26, 1913. It was owned and operated by Michigan Central Railroad and was planned as part of a large project that included the Michigan Central Railway Tunnel below the Detroit River for freight and passengers. The old station was located on a spur line, which was inconvenient for the high volume of passengers it served. The new Michigan Central placed passenger service on the main line.

The growing trend toward increased automobile use was not a large concern in 1912, as is evident in the design of the building. Most passengers would arrive at and leave from Michigan Central Station by interurban service or streetcar, due to the station's distance from downtown Detroit. The station was placed away from downtown in order to stimulate related development to come in its direction. An ambitious project to connect the station to the Cultural Center via a wide boulevard was never realized. Nonetheless, the station remained active for several decades. The trains of the New York Central Railroad, the company which acquired the Michigan Central Railroad, the Baltimore and Ohio Railroad and the Canadian Pacific Railway operated from the station.

At the beginning of World War I, the peak of rail travel in the United States, more than 200 trains left the station each day and lines would stretch from the boarding gates to the main entrance. In the 1940s, more than 4,000 passengers a day used the station and more than 3,000 people worked in its office tower. Among notable passengers arriving at MCS were Presidents Herbert Hoover, Harry S. Truman and Franklin D. Roosevelt, actor Charlie Chaplin, inventor Thomas Edison and artists Frida Kahlo and Diego Rivera. The other major station of Detroit was the Fort Street Union Depot.

In the 1920s Henry Ford began to buy land near the station and made construction plans, but the Great Depression and other circumstances squelched this and many other development efforts. The original design included no large parking facility. When the interurban service was discontinued less than two decades after MCS opened, the station was effectively isolated from the large majority of the population who drove cars and needed parking to use the facility.

Named trains
Major trains and destinations included:
Baltimore & Ohio
Ambassador to New York City (Jersey City CNJ terminal) via Pittsburgh, PA and Washington, D.C.
Shenandoah, route as above
Cincinnatian, to Cincinnati via Toledo and Dayton
Great Lakes Limited, to Louisville via Toledo, Dayton and Cincinnati
New York Central
Canadian, to Montreal and later, Canadian-Niagara from Chicago in the west, to Buffalo and Toronto in the east (with Canadian Pacific carrying from Detroit to Toronto)
Dominion-Overseas, to Montreal
Chicago Mercury, to Chicago
Cleveland Mercury, to Cleveland 
Detroiter, to New York City
Empire State Express, to New York City
Mercury, Chicago to the west, Cleveland to the east
New York Special, Chicago to the west, to New York City to the east, via Southwestern Ontario
North Shore Limited (westbound only), to Chicago to the west, from Toronto (pooled with Canadian Pacific's Chicago Express) and New York City in the east
Northerner, to Mackinaw City, Michigan via Bay City, Michigan
Ohio Special (northbound: Michigan Special), to Cincinnati via Toledo and Dayton
Queen City, to Cincinnati via Toledo and Dayton
Timberliner, to Mackinaw City, Michigan via Bay City, Michigan
Twilight Limited, to Chicago
Wolverine, Chicago to New York City via Southwestern Ontario

Decline and abandonment

Passenger volume did not decrease immediately. During World War II, the station was used heavily by military troops. After the war, with a growth in automobile ownership, people used trains less frequently for vacation or other travel. Another attempted sale in 1963 failed for lack of buyers. In 1967, maintenance costs were seen as too high relative to the decreasing passenger volume. The restaurant, arcade shops, and main entrance were closed, along with much of the main waiting room. This left only two ticket windows to serve passengers and visitors, who used the same parking-lot entrance as railroad employees working in the building.

Meanwhile, service to destinations was curtailed. By 1960 the New York Central ended its direct service south to Toledo, on its own timetable yielding that responsibility to the B&O. In 1963 the B&O moved its trains over to the Fort Street Union Depot. The New York Central ended the last of its trains bound north for Bay City in 1964. The pooled New York Central/Central Pacific trains were discontinued and the Canadian Pacific trains to Windsor ended in 1967; and the New York Central ended its named trains by the close of 1967. Any remaining New York Central trains were segmented operations between major cities. The trains run by the NYC's successor in 1968, the Penn Central continued the segmented operations at the station.

Amtrak assumed operation of the nation's passenger rail service in 1971, reopening the main waiting room and entrance in 1975. It started a $1.25 million renovation project in 1978. Six years later, the building was sold for a transportation center project that never materialized. On January 6, 1988, the last Amtrak train pulled away from the station after owners decided to close the facility. Amtrak service continued at a platform on Rose Street near the former station building until the new Detroit station opened several miles away in New Center in 1994. In July 1992, the Detroit Master Plan of Policies for the southwest sector's urban design identified the station as an attractive or interesting feature to be recognized, enhanced and promoted.

Moroun ownership
Controlled Terminals Inc. acquired the station in 1996. Its sister company, the Detroit International Bridge Co., owns the nearby Ambassador Bridge and both are part of a group of transportation-related companies which were owned by late businessman Manuel Moroun, Chairman and CEO of CenTra Inc.  The company demolished the train shed in 2000, and converted the remaining tracks and platforms into an intermodal freight facility, named "Expressway" and operated by Canadian Pacific Railway. This facility was closed in June 2004.

In 2004, Detroit mayor Kwame Kilpatrick announced that the city was pursuing options to relocate its Detroit Police Department headquarters and possibly consolidate other law enforcement offices to MCS. However, in mid-2005, the city canceled the plan and chose to renovate its existing headquarters. In 2006 it was proposed that the station be redeveloped into a Trade Processing Center adapting the station as a customs and international trade processing center due to its proximity to the Ambassador Bridge. Although the City of Detroit considered the building a "Priority Cultural Site" in 2006, the City Council on April 7, 2009, passed a resolution to demolish the structure. Seven days later, Detroit resident Stanley Christmas sued the city of Detroit to stop the demolition effort, citing the National Historic Preservation Act of 1966.

In 2008, the station owners said that their goal was to renovate the decaying building. The estimated cost of renovations was $80 million, but the owners viewed finding the right use as a greater problem than financing. Moroun proposed making the station into a convention center and casino Such a project would have cost $1.2 billion, including $300 million to restore the station. Dan Stamper, president of Detroit International Bridge, noted that the station should have been used as one of the city's casinos. In 2010, State Senator Cameron S. Brown and Mickey Bashfield, a government relations official for the building owner CenTra Inc., suggested that the station could become the Detroit headquarters of the Michigan State Police, include some United States Department of Homeland Security offices, and serve as a center for trade inspections. The development never came to fruition.

On March 25, 2011, in an effort to push forward a potential sale and redevelopment, Dan Stamper, spokesperson for Ambassador Bridge owner Manuel "Matty" Moroun, announced plans to work with the City of Detroit on funding replacement of the tower's roof, and installing new windows on the structure. Stamper told The Detroit News: "It would be much easier to help a developer to come up with a package to use the depot if some improvements were made." In June 2011, work began on partial asbestos abatement on the first floor; other work conducted included interior demolition work, removal of broken glass from first floor windows, and removal of water. In June 2012, electricity was restored to the interior. Lights have illuminated the main lobby nightly.

On May 5, 2011, the Detroit International Bridge Company announced it engaged the Ann Arbor firm of Quinn Evans on behalf of the Moroun family that owns the building to oversee restoration of the roof and windows of the structure. Bridge Company owner Moroun stated, "We hope this is just the beginning of a renaissance for the depot."

On June 10, 2014, it was reported that the owners of Michigan Central Station were moving forward with about $676,000 in rehab work, and had received permits to install a new 9,000-pound capacity freight elevator, which will allow for the smooth installation of new windows and roof work. In late 2014 work to install the elevator started, with an expected completion by February.

In February 2015, the owners announced that they would replace more than 1,000 windows above the first level. In late April the city announced a land swap deal with the Bridge Company to transfer a 3-acre strip of Riverside Park near the Ambassador Bridge for 4.8 acres of adjacent property owned by the Bridge Company. As part of that agreement, the city would receive up to $5 million for park improvements, and the Bridge Company agreed to replace the windows in the train station. In July the Detroit City Council approved the land transfer. As of December 2015, all of the new windows have been installed.

As of August 2016, the Moroun family had spent 10 years and $12 million on electricity, windows and the elevator shaft, to revitalize the building. Matthew Moroun said he might put part of his family's operations in the 18-story Corktown building. In September 2017 the "Detroit Homecoming" event was held in the station, the first legal event to occur there since the building's closure in 1988.

Ford ownership
On March 20, 2018, The Detroit News published an article noting the Ford Motor Company was in talks to buy the structure. On May 22, 2018, ownership of the building was transferred from the Moroun-owned MCS Crown Land Development Co. LLC to New Investment Properties I LLC. Ford's representatives neither confirmed nor denied if this ownership exchange was made by them.

The Moroun family confirmed on June 11, 2018, that Ford was the new owner of the building. Ford purchased the station along with the Roosevelt Warehouse. Ford plans to turn the building into a hub for its autonomous vehicle development and deployment, and it will be the anchor for the company's Corktown campus. The building will hold both Ford offices and offices of suppliers and partner companies. The first floor concourse will reopen to the public with restaurants and retail. Housing will also be created on the top floors. Restoration and renovations are expected to be completed by 2022.

On June 19, 2018, Ford held a community celebration, in which local rapper Big Sean performed, and the building was opened to the public for the first time since its closure in the 1980s. According to local Detroit media outlets, Ford plans to renovate the station, the warehouse next door, and complete construction on the rest of its campus within four years, and is part of the company's $1 billion capital improvements project, which also includes the creation of a development on the West side of Dearborn, Michigan, as well as a renovation of the company's main headquarters in Dearborn. As part of that $1 billion, Ford Land is actively seeking at least $250 million in tax and other incentives, and has claimed that the project would not be financially feasible without the support of incentives.

CEO of Ford Land, Dave Dubensky, stated during an interview with the Detroit Free Press that Ford plans to retain four of the passenger tracks at MCS in the event that Amtrak returns from the station in New Center as well as for potential commuter rail. Previous Amtrak routes that utilized MCS included the Wolverine, Lake Cities, Twilight Limited, and Niagara Rainbow. There have been other rail related projects in the area around the station in recent years. In 2010, The U.S. Department of Transportation awarded $244 million in grants for high-speed rail upgrades between Chicago and Detroit. A consortium of investors, including the Canadian Pacific Railway, has proposed a new, larger rail tunnel capable of handling large double-stacked freight cars under the Detroit River.

In December 2018 Ford began Phase I of the building restoration.  The work involved drying out the building and reinforcement of structural columns and archways.  Phase II began in May 2019 and consisted of masonry restoration of the tower and concourse, retiling of the ceiling of the waiting room, and repair of the structural steel. 3-D scanning technology was used to recreate architectural details lost to exposure and vandalism. As of late 2021 work was progressing on the building's masonry facade. Restoration is anticipated to be competed in late 2022 or early 2023.

Architecture

The building is of the Beaux-Arts Classical style of architecture, designed by the Warren & Wetmore and Reed and Stem firms who also designed New York City's Grand Central Terminal. Michigan Central was designed at the same time, and is seen as a spiritual twin to Grand Central in New York, as both were meant as flagship stations on Vanderbilt's rail lines, both were designed to have office towers in their original design concepts (though Grand Central's tower was never built), both have the same detailing, and were opened six months apart. The price tag for this  building was $15 million when it was built. Roosevelt Park creates a grand entryway for the station, which was fully realized around 1920.

The building is composed of two distinct parts: the train station and the 18-story office tower. The original plan for the tower included a hotel, offices for the rail company, or a combination of both. The tower was used only for office space by the Michigan Central Railroad and subsequent owners of the building. The tower was never completely used; the top floors were never completely furnished, and served no function.

The main waiting room on the main floor was modeled after an ancient Roman bathhouse, with walls of marble and vaulted ceilings. The building also housed a large hall adorned with Doric columns that housed the ticket office and arcade shops. Beyond the arcade was the concourse, which had brick walls and a large copper skylight. From here, passengers would walk down a ramp to a tunnel from which the platforms could be accessed by stairs and elevators.  Under the shed there were ten passenger platforms consisting of one side platform and five island platforms along ten paired tracks. In addition, one track served the Railway Express Agency (REA) mail service at the southern end of the shed. Immediately outside the shed were seven additional freight tracks. Below the tracks and building was a large area for baggage and mail handling and offices.

After the purchase of the building by Ford in 2018, several individuals came forward looking to return property and architectural features that were stripped and stolen from the station after its closing in 1988, the biggest item of note being the main station clock. The building renovation for Ford is being designed by Quinn Evans Architects of Detroit.

In popular culture
The station has been featured in several films: 
In September 2002, extensive closeups and fly-by shots were featured in the movie Naqoyqatsi. 
The 2005 film Four Brothers opens with the main character driving his car along the front of Michigan Central Station toward Michigan Avenue. 
In January 2005, it was used as a location set for the movie The Island (directed by Michael Bay). 
MCS was used for scenes in the movie Transformers (also directed by Bay) in October 2006.

The building has been used in some of rapper Eminem's work, including the title sequence of the movie 8 Mile and his music video for the song "Beautiful", during the beginning of which the building features prominently. 
A scene from the ABC crime drama Detroit 1-8-7 was shot and set inside the station, and it often appeared in the background in other episodes. 
The building's lobby was significant in the closing scenes of the 2012 documentary Detropia. 
It was also used in a climactic fight scene in the 2016 movie Batman v Superman: Dawn of Justice. 
Its exterior was used in the Arrow episode titled "Doppelganger". 
It is also featured in the video game Midnight Club 3: Dub Edition.
It is featured in the novel Influx by Daniel Suarez.
It is also shown in the 2016 movie Abattoir as the exterior for a jail that houses the criminally insane.

See also
Brush Street Station
Ford Piquette Avenue Plant
Fort Street Union Depot
List of railway stations

References

Further reading

External links

 
Talk to the Station — Gallery of historical photographs
Detroiturbex — More historical photographs

Corktown, Detroit
Skyscraper office buildings in Detroit
Windsor Subdivision
National Register of Historic Places in Detroit
Ford Motor Company facilities
Railway stations in Detroit
Railway stations in the United States opened in 1913
Railway stations closed in 1988
Beaux-Arts architecture in Michigan
Railway stations on the National Register of Historic Places in Michigan
Former Amtrak stations in Michigan
Buildings and structures under construction in the United States
Reed and Stem buildings
Warren and Wetmore buildings
1913 establishments in Michigan
Detroit
Repurposed railway stations in the United States
Former New York Central Railroad stations
Former Baltimore and Ohio Railroad stations
Canadian Pacific Railway stations